The Hidden Treasure of Glaston  is a children's historical novel by Eleanore M. Jewett, first published in 1946. Set in 1171 England, the story involves Hugh and Dickon the Oblate searching for the Holy Grail in an area associated with King Arthur. The novel won a Newbery Honor award in 1947. It has also been published as Hidden Treasure.

Plot 
The Hidden Treasure of Glaston is an exciting mystery thriller about a boy's journey in becoming a man and his struggle to obtain the Holy Grail that Jesus used at the Last Supper.  The Hidden Treasure of Glaston takes place in Britain in 1171, and the story is seen through the eyes of the main character Hugh, a sickly boy whose father abandons him at Glastonbury Abbey when he is 12 years old. He seeks occupation at the monastery's scriptorium, where it is the monks' responsibility to copy the scriptures as the printing press was not yet invented. Hugh does not show much promise upon his arrival at the monastery at first but makes immense changes as he transforms into a responsible, persevering, and religious young man. It is nearing the end of his journey that he shows the qualities and personal growth that make him seem more refined in all aspects of his personality. He shows little regard towards his well-being as he begins to travel knowing the dangers he would face. The journey unravels with him escaping from a mob that chases after him, finding his way through deserts and caves and making it to Glaston before he gets caught. Despite all the difficulties he faces throughout the story, he shows perseverance. He becomes a new person through his adventures, having developed more strength, faith and courage.

Characters 
 Hugh — the protagonist of the story, a knight's son
 Dickon — an oblate, Hugh's loyal friend in all his endeavors
 Bleheris — an old minstrel hermit whose only desire is to see the holy grail. 
 Brother John - a monk from the abbey of Glastonbury whose task is to prepare ink and parchment for writing books
 Brother Symon - a monk that tends the poor and beggars in the almonry.
 Joseph of Arimathea — a resident of Glastonbury who has lived out his days shrouded in mystery
 Sir Hugh de Morville - Hugh's dishonored father

Critical reception
Many critics regard the piece of literature as a masterful story told through the eyes of an adolescent, and it is obvious to see why, because it inspires the spirit of adventure. This story features many real life artifacts, especially with Christianity. The events in this story seem to be what is receiving such critical acclaim. Nevertheless, this is a story for ages, and many critics really love this book and the wholesome morals it holds.

Awards 
 Newbery Medal Honor Book 1947

References 

1946 American novels
1946 children's books
Children's historical novels
American children's books
Newbery Honor-winning works
Holy Grail in fiction
1171
Fiction set in the 1170s